Dennis George A'Court (27 July 1937 – 23 May 2021) was a Welsh-born cricketer who played for Gloucestershire. A right-arm medium-fast bowler and a right-handed tail-end batsman, he played first-class cricket for Gloucestershire between 1960 and 1963. He was born in Markham in Monmouthshire, a former mining village.

He took 145 first-class wickets, with a best of 6 for 25 against the South African tourists in 1960: Wisden noted that he "shocked the South Africans with his accuracy, liveliness, and disconcerting swing and movement of the ball."  He took five wickets in an innings on five occasions.

References

1937 births
2021 deaths
Cricketers from Caerphilly County Borough
Gloucestershire cricketers
Welsh cricketers